Dedeaux Field is a college baseball stadium in Los Angeles, California, U.S., on the west end of the campus of the University of Southern California. The home field of the USC Trojans of the Pac-12 Conference, it has a seating capacity of 2,500.

It opened  in 1974, the year USC won its record fifth consecutive College World Series title, the sixth in seven years. It is named after longtime head coach Rod Dedeaux (1914–2006), who led the Trojans from 1942 until his retirement at age 72 in June 1986.

Bovard's home plate was located in today's E.F. Hutton Park and a large eucalyptus tree guarded the right field line.

Tournaments hosted
NCAA Regional Tournaments (7): 1974, 1975, 1978, 1991, 1999, 2001, 2002
NCAA Super Regional Series (1): 2001
PAC-8 Playoffs (2): 1974, 1977
PAC-10 Playoffs (2): 1995, 1996

USC record at Dedeaux Field (2004–2009)

2028 Summer Olympics
During the 2028 Summer Olympics, Dedeaux Field will be modified into a temporary aquatics venue which will host swimming, synchronized swimming and diving.

Gallery

See also
 List of NCAA Division I baseball venues

References

External links

College baseball venues in the United States
USC Trojans baseball venues
Sports venues completed in 1974
Baseball venues in Los Angeles
Venues of the 2028 Summer Olympics
Olympic swimming venues
Olympic diving venues
Olympic synchronized swimming venues